Mark L. Reuss is the current President of General Motors.

Early life and education 
Mark's father is Lloyd E. Reuss, former president at GM from 1990 to 1992. He received an undergraduate degree from Vanderbilt University in 1986 and an MBA from Duke University's Fuqua School of Business in 1990.

Career 
In 2001 he was appointed executive director of the Performance Division, then executive director of Global Vehicle Integration, Safety and Virtual Development in 2005, and held the position of President of General Motors North America from 2009 until 2013.

Later he served as a chairman and managing director of Holden, the Australasian General Motors (GM) operation from February 1, 2008 until September 1, 2009, overseeing GM's Australasian operations and is a director on the GM Asia Pacific Strategy Board.

Reuss was the vehicle line executive in charge of the highly criticized and unsuccessful Pontiac Aztek and Buick Rendezvous. However, he was praised for his tenure in the early 2010s for leading product development.

From September 1, 2009, Alan Batey took over his position as Reuss returned to the GM in the United States as a senior product development director.

On June 3, 2018, Reuss crashed the Corvette ZR1 pace car that he was driving in the first corner of the first pace lap of the second race at the 2018 Detroit Grand Prix, leading to a lengthy delay, and unwanted publicity for Reuss and General Motors.  Reuss and passenger Mark Sandy were uninjured.

One year later, he got back in the Pace car for the 2019 Race 1 of the Grand Prix in hard rain – and led the field without incident. He also debuted the new Cadillac V-series at the race in full camo. In 2020 he was the honorary pace car driver for the Indianapolis 500.

Electric Corvette 
On, April 27, 2022, General Motors president Mark Reuss announced that it is developing "an electrified and a fully electric" version of its Chevrolet Corvette.

References

External links
 Mark Reuss profile at General Motors

Holden executives
General Motors executives
Living people
Year of birth missing (living people)